Jankowice may refer to the following villages in Poland:
Jankowice, Pszczyna County in Silesian Voivodeship (south Poland)
Jankowice, Lower Silesian Voivodeship (south-west Poland)
Jankowice, Kuyavian-Pomeranian Voivodeship (north-central Poland)
Jankowice, Lublin Voivodeship (east Poland)
Jankowice, Brzeziny County in Łódź Voivodeship (central Poland)
Jankowice, Kutno County in Łódź Voivodeship (central Poland)
Jankowice, Radomsko County in Łódź Voivodeship (central Poland)
Jankowice, Chrzanów County in Lesser Poland Voivodeship (south Poland)
Jankowice, Proszowice County in Lesser Poland Voivodeship (south Poland)
Jankowice, Subcarpathian Voivodeship (south-east Poland)
Jankowice, Świętokrzyskie Voivodeship (south-central Poland)
Jankowice, Grójec County in Masovian Voivodeship (east-central Poland)
Jankowice, Radom County in Masovian Voivodeship (east-central Poland)
Jankowice, Szydłowiec County in Masovian Voivodeship (east-central Poland)
Jankowice, Greater Poland Voivodeship (west-central Poland)
Jankowice, Racibórz County in Silesian Voivodeship (south Poland)
Jankowice, Działdowo County in Warmian-Masurian Voivodeship (north Poland)
Jankowice, Kętrzyn County in Warmian-Masurian Voivodeship (north Poland)

See also
Jenkovce, Slovakia